Oliver Sarkic (born 23 July 1997) is a professional footballer who plays as an attacking midfielder for Pakhtakor. He has played for the Montenegro national under-21 team. He came through the academies of Anderlecht and Benfica. He has also played for Fafe, Leeds United, Barakaldo, Burton Albion, Mansfield Town and Blackpool.

Club career

Early career
On 1 September 2014, Sarkic joined Portuguese champions Benfica from Belgian club Anderlecht, being assigned to their youth team. He debuted professionally for Benfica B in a 3–2 win over Porto B in Segunda Liga, on 11 January 2015. On 14 February 2015, he scored twice in a 4–1 home win against Oliveirense.

In January 2017, Sarkic joined AD Fafe on loan until the end of the season, during his loan stint he made 19 league appearances, scoring twice. In July 2017, he had a trial for then Premier League side Swansea City, featuring in two U23 friendlies against Glentoran and Cliftonville.

Leeds United
On 8 September 2017, Sarkic joined English side Leeds United on a loan deal until 31 December 2017, being assigned to their under-23 team. He signed a permanent deal with Leeds United on 11 January 2018, with the contract running until 2020 and the club option of a further year.

On 1 September 2018, Sarkic joined Spanish Segunda División B club Barakaldo CF on a season-long loan.

Burton Albion
On 27 July 2019, Sarkic joined EFL League One side Burton Albion on trial from Leeds, starting in their pre-season friendly against Chesterfield On 1 August, he joined Albion on a permanent deal for an undisclosed figure. He scored his first goal for Burton in an EFL Cup tie against Bournemouth on 25 September 2019.

Blackpool
Sarkic signed a two-year deal with Blackpool on 9 July 2020. On 1 February 2021, Sarkic joined League Two side Mansfield Town on loan for the remainder of the 2020-21 season.

He was released by the club, in a mutual agreement, on 26 January 2022.

On 3 February 2022, Sarkic joined Uzbekistan Super League side Pakhtakor until the end of the year.

Personal life
Sarkic has a twin brother, Matija, who also is a footballer. Sarkic was raised in Belgium and attended The British School of Brussels.

Career statistics

References

External links

1997 births
Living people
Footballers from Grimsby
English people of Montenegrin descent
Association football forwards
English footballers
Montenegrin footballers
Montenegro youth international footballers
Montenegro under-21 international footballers
S.L. Benfica B players
Liga Portugal 2 players
AD Fafe players
Leeds United F.C. players
Segunda División B players
Barakaldo CF footballers
Burton Albion F.C. players
Blackpool F.C. players
Mansfield Town F.C. players
English expatriate footballers
Montenegrin expatriate footballers
Expatriate footballers in Portugal
Expatriate footballers in Spain
English expatriate sportspeople in Portugal
English expatriate sportspeople in Spain
Montenegrin expatriate sportspeople in Portugal
Montenegrin expatriate sportspeople in Spain
Montenegrin people of English descent